Adelard of Ghent was an 11th-century biographer of Saint Dunstan.

Print editions
 Epistola Adelardi ad Elfegum Archiepiscopum de Vita Sancti Dunstani, Adelard's letter to Archbishop Ælfheah of Canterbury (1005–1012) on the Life of St Dunstan, edited by W. Stubbs in Memorials of St Dunstan, Archbishop of Canterbury. Rolls Series 63. London, 1874. 53–68. 
 Also in the new edition and translation by Michael Lapidge and Michael Winterbottom, The Early Lives of St Dunstan, Oxford University Press, 2012.

Citations

References
 

Hagiographers
Male biographers
11th-century English writers
11th-century Latin writers